Christopher Thomas Howell (born December 7, 1966) is an American actor. He has starred in the films Soul Man, The Hitcher, Grandview U.S.A., Red Dawn, Secret Admirer and The Outsiders. He has also appeared in Gettysburg and Gods and Generals as Thomas Chamberlain, E.T. the Extra-Terrestrial, The Amazing Spider-Man, Justice League: The Flashpoint Paradox and Suicide Squad: Hell to Pay.

Early life
Howell was born in the Van Nuys neighborhood of Los Angeles to Christopher N. and Candice Howell. He has three siblings, sisters Stacy and Candy, and brother John.

His father worked as a stunt coordinator and rodeo performer. He played the role of the Red Knight in Terry Gilliam’s The Fisher King. As a young boy, Howell wanted to be a stuntman and was a child stunt performer. He was also a rodeo star.

When Howell was young, his parents divorced. Howell graduated from Saugus High School in 1984.

Career

Acting
Howell made his show business debut in The Brian Keith Show. When he got older, he acted in commercials.

1980s
In 1982, Howell made his film debut as Tyler in Steven Spielberg's E.T. the Extra-Terrestrial.

At the age of 15, Howell was cast in Francis Ford Coppola's The Outsiders (1983). Howell played the lead role of Ponyboy Curtis, "the soulful tagalong greaser through whose eyes we see the events of the 1960s-set film unfold." Based on S.E. Hinton's bestselling 1967 novel of the same name, the coming-of-age film went on to become a cult classic. Howell's portrayal of Ponyboy was his breakthrough role, and it earned him a Young Artist Award.

In 1984, Howell and his Outsiders co-star, Patrick Swayze, reunited for Grandview, U.S.A. and Red Dawn. Howell also had a pivotal role in Tank (1984). In 1985, he starred in Secret Admirer.  
After filming The Outsiders, Howell co-starred in his own television series, Two Marriages, which ended after four episodes, but letters of support got it back on air. He later expressed disappointment in the series. 

Howell was one of two final actors in the running for the lead role of Marty McFly in Back to the Future (1985); the other was Eric Stoltz. Ultimately, Michael J. Fox was cast as Marty after Stoltz was deemed wrong for the part. In 1986, Howell was a hitchhiker's target in the film The Hitcher. (He also starred in the sequel, which was released in 2003.)   Rounding out the 80s, Howell played the young Arturo Toscanini in  Franco Zeffirelli's 1988 film, Giovane Toscanini.  The film, about the world-renowned Toscanini's conducting debut, also starred Elizabeth Taylor; however, it was never released domestically.

1990s
In 1993, Howell starred with Linda Fiorentino and Nancy Allen in the campy thriller Acting on Impulse.  He then
achieved success in the film Gettysburg, which was popular with history buffs and history classrooms. Next, he starred as Mike, a motorcycle courier in the poorly received Mad Dogs and Englishmen (U.S. title: Shameless) with Elizabeth Hurley.

Following this, Howell starred in Payback and then played gangster Baby Face Nelson in the film of the same name. He went on to direct and star in the 1996 direct-to-video release, Pure Danger, which also featured Teri Ann Linn and prop comic, Carrot Top.

2000s
In 2000, Howell played a doctor stranded on a deserted island after a plane crash in the television show Amazon. In 2004, he played serial killer Kenneth Bianchi in The Hillside Strangler.

In 2005, he starred in H. G. Wells' War of the Worlds, one of three 2005 adaptations of the novel The War of the Worlds by H. G. Wells. Howell directed and starred in a straight-to-DVD sequel War of the Worlds 2: The Next Wave in 2008. Also in 2005, he reunited with his Secret Admirer co-star Lori Loughlin when he had a recurring role on her television show Summerland as Zac Efron's father. Howell appeared as a doctor in The Poseidon Adventure, an adaptation of the 1972 film of the same name. His father's first (uncredited) stunt co-ordination was for the original film.

In 2006, Howell starred in Hoboken Hollow. He also became a supporter of the production company The Asylum, which produced his straight-to-DVD films.  In 2008, Howell directed and starred in The Day the Earth Stopped, a mockbuster intended to capitalize on The Day the Earth Stood Still.

Beginning in 2009, Howell guest starred in Criminal Minds on CBS as serial killer George Foyet (The Boston Reaper), a recurring villain based on The Boston Strangler. Also beginning in 2009, he played the role of Officer Bill 'Dewey' Dudek, a police officer recovering from alcoholism, in the L.A. police drama Southland.

2010s
In 2011, Howell guest starred as an inmate on The Glades and in Torchwood: Miracle Day.

Howell appeared in the 2012 film The Amazing Spider-Man.

Starting in 2015, Howell has had a recurring role as Dr. Daniel Stinger in the Freeform show Stitchers. In 2017, he had a recurring role as Ash Spenser, a retired Navy SEAL, in the CBS show SEAL Team.

In 2016 and 2018, Howell had a recurring guest-star role as Paul Belmont, a United States Navy Lieutenant Commander at Camp Pendleton, in Seasons 1 and 3 of Animal Kingdom.

Off-screen
Howell has worked with Francis Ford Coppola many times and in other areas of making motion pictures including writing, producing, and directing. In 1995, he wrote and directed Hourglass, in which he starred with Sofia Shinas. The following year, he helped produce The Big Fall and Pure Danger.

Howell did not write or direct another film until 2004. He and his father co-wrote the made-for-television film Hope Ranch, which Howell produced. Howell went on to write and produce Blind Injustice the next year. Two years later, he produced The Stolen Moments of September.

Personal life
In the 1980s, Howell dated actress Kyle Richards. In 1989, He married actress Rae Dawn Chong, whom he met while co-starring with her in the 1986 film Soul Man. They divorced the following year. Howell married his second wife, Sylvie Anderson, in 1992, and  the couple had three children together.     Anderson filed for divorce in 2016.

In November 2001, Howell was acquitted of five misdemeanor charges arising out of a confrontation with a skateboarder in southern California.

Filmography

Film

Television

Video games

Discography

Singles

Albums

References

External links
 

1966 births
Male actors from Los Angeles
American male child actors
American male film actors
American male television actors
American male voice actors
Living people
20th-century American male actors
21st-century American male actors
People from Van Nuys, Los Angeles